Jules Girardin (1832-1888) was a French writer.

Works
 Les aventures de M. Colin-Tampon
 Contes à Jeannot
 Contes à Pierrot, 1888

External links
 
 

1832 births
1888 deaths
People from Loches
French male writers
Writers from Centre-Val de Loire